The siege of Novogeorgievsk was a battle of World War I fought after the Germans broke the Russian defenses at the Hindenburg's Bug-Narew Offensive. In terms of the ratio of casualties and trophies, the German victory at Novogeorgievsk surpassed the victory at Tannenberg in 1914. It is also one of the most brilliant victories in the capture of a heavily fortified fortress, defended by superior enemy forces.

Background
As a result of the retreat of the Russian 1st and 2nd armies during German Bug-Narew Offensive, the fortress of Novogeorgievsk  was blocked from the south by the division of Lieutenant General Thilo von Westernhagen from the German 9th Army. The chief of staff of the Supreme Commander of All German Forces in the East E. Ludendorff sent M. von Gallwitz an order for a "parallel pursuit" of Russian troops along the Bug River in order to intercept their retreat to the east. The capture of Novogeorgievsk was entrusted to the Siege Corps of General Hans Hartwig von Beseler, while Ludendorff insisted on attacking the fortress from the east, from the confluence of the Bug and Vistula rivers, while Gallwitz considered it more convenient to attack from the north, where there were no water barriers.

Comparison of strength

In Novogeorgievsk, at the time of isolation from the Russian field armies, there were 1,027 officers, 445 military officials and doctors, 90,214 soldiers (58th, 63rd, 114th, 119th infantry divisions, fortress artillery, engineering and construction units; combat strength - 37,552 infantry, 282 cavalry, 1626 sappers). The armament consisted of 197 machine guns, 1,253 guns. The fortress was well supplied with ammunition. For each barrel of heavy and fortress artillery of 4,2-inch caliber there were 660 shells, 4,8-inch - 1,030, 6-inch caliber - up to 900, 8-inch - 600, 10-inch - 153, anti-aeroplane - 960, 57-mm and 3-inch anti-assault - 350 each, for half-pood mortars - 520 each, 49 missiles per rocket launcher. Literally on the eve of the complete blockade, 4 million rifle cartridges arrived in the fortress from Ivangorod.

In the von Beseler group, 55 battalions were assembled, 10 squadrons, 69.5 batteries (390 guns), including heavy guns: mortar 42cm - 6, 30.5cm -10, 21cm-8, 15cm howitzers-44, guns 15cm-8, 12cm-4, 10cm-8, 1,000 shells were allocated for each light gun, 600 shells for heavy guns and howitzers, 400 shells for 21cm mortars, 200 shells for 30.5cm and 42cm mortars. For the most part, the infantry was represented by the Landwehr, Landsturm and reserve regiments; on the Russian side, the militia made up half of the garrison, but, unlike the Germans, they had no combat experience. On August 7, the H. von Beseler group was separated from the 12th Army and subordinated directly to the Supreme Commander of All German Forces in the East.

Battle
Novogeorgievsk was surrounded on 10 August and the bombardment began few days later and was concentrated on the north-eastern portion of the defenses, lying north of the Vistula River. The German assault was helped after the capture of the fort's Chief Inspector with detailed plans of the fort's defences. After a 3-day bombardment, on August 16, X. von Beseler's corps proceeded to storm the forts in the northeastern and eastern parts of the outer belt of forts. Colonel T. von Pfeil's brigade captured forts XV and XVb by 4 p.m. and had 150 prisoners in them; the 10th and 38th Landwehr Regiments, after a stubborn battle, captured Fort XVa by 2 a.m. Attacks on forts XVla and XVIb near Charnovo were repulsed by the garrison.  

Against the forts of the northeastern (Pomekhovsky) defense sector of Novogeorgievsk, the attacks of the Germans continued. The attempts of the garrison to recapture the forts of group XV were unsuccessful, the commander of the 455th infantry regiment, Colonel S. Shiryaev, died in counterattacks: the 21st and Pfeil brigades were sent to the forts of group XVI, but their attack was repelled by the garrison. At the same time, after shelling by the forces of the 169th Landwehr Brigade, the forts of Group XIV were attacked. Major General P. Venevitinov, commander of the Pomekhovsky sector, ordered to clear the forts and retreat to the second line of defense, blowing up the fortifications. But it turned out that there was no stock of pyroxylin in the forts, and the sappers sent for it did not return. The forts fell into the hands of the Germans in complete safety. On the evening of August 17, the commandant of the fortress Nikolai Bobyr ordered to retreat across the Wkra River, to the redoubts of the main bypass of the fortress. Since the airfield in Modlin was under the threat of shelling, it was decided to evacuate the vehicles with crews, and burn 5 faulty ones. On 9 planes, 12 officers and 5 lower ranks flew out of the fortress, secret files, the standard of the fortress and a supply of golden Crosses of St. George were taken out; along the way, one aircraft went missing.

On August 18, in Novogeorgievsk, the siege artillery of X. von Beseler's group was moved to new positions, closer to the second belt of forts; the forts of the Zakrochimsky and Vymyslovsky sectors were captured. The chief of staff of the fortress, Major General N. Globachev, telegraphed to the staff of the North-Western Front that there was no hope of holding Novogeorgievsk, the defense on the inner belt could last no more than one day.

On August 19 fighting broke out on the second line of forts. Early in the morning forts X, XI and XIV were occupied by the Germans. At Fort II and III, the Russian 249th Infantry Regiment counterattacked Pfeil's Landwehr Brigade; in the midst of the battle, the German field artillery fired all the ammunition and could be captured, but the heavy batteries advanced forward helped repel the onslaught. By 13-00 forts I, II and III were captured by the Germans. Having again moved the heavy batteries forward, the German troops captured the second line of fortifications. The defenders of the fortress on the northern bank of the Vistula had only the citadel and Zakrochim left, the forts on the southern bank were not stormed, the German troops were only approaching them. However, heavy artillery was now shelling the entire space of the citadel, destroying the fortifications. In the evening, large groups of fortress defenders began to raise white flags and surrender, columns of German infantry approached the citadel, communication with the fortress was interrupted. At 2 am on August 20, the commandant of the fortress, cavalry general N. Bobyr, left for negotiations with the commander of the Siege Group X. von Beseler. At 4 o'clock the terms of surrender were signed, an hour later the German artillery ceased fire.

Outcome
The largest fortress of the Russian Empire fell. In the hands of the German Army were 1,500 officers and up to 90,000 soldiers, 1,640 guns, 103 machine guns, 23,219 rifles, 160,000 shells and 7.1 million cartridges. Among the prisoners were 18 generals. German casualties were absolutely insignificant compared to the Russian. About 100 (one hundred) men killed and missing versus 90,000 killed and captured in the Russian army (the ratio is almost 1 to 1,000).

See also
Bug–Narew Offensive

Photo Gallery

References

External links

http://www.historyofwar.org/articles/siege_novo_georgievsk.html
https://blogs.loc.gov/loc/2016/12/world-war-i-on-the-firing-line-with-the-germans-1915/

Battles of the Eastern Front (World War I)
Russian Empire in World War I
Battles of World War I involving Germany
Battles of World War I involving Russia
Conflicts in 1915
1915 in the Russian Empire
1915 in Poland
Novogeorgievsk
Novogeorgievsk
Novogeorgievsk
August 1915 events